Hum To Tere Aashiq Hai is an Indian Marathi language comedy series which aired on Zee Marathi. It starred Prasad Oak, Madhavi Nimkar, Deepti Ketkar and Pushkar Shrotri in lead roles. It premiered from 8 November 2017 by replacing Naktichya Lagnala Yayach Ha.

Cast 
 Prasad Oak as Sangram Waghmare
 Deepti Ketkar as Kaveri Sangram Waghmare
 Pushkar Shrotri as Pushkar Gupte
 Madhavi Nimkar as Shalini Pushkar Gupte
 Madan Deodhar as Mangesh (Monty)
 Anvita Phaltankar as Pinky

References

External links 
 
 Hum To Tere Aashiq Hai at ZEE5
 
Marathi-language television shows
2017 Indian television series debuts
Zee Marathi original programming
2018 Indian television series endings